Yeongdong station is a railway station in South Korea on the Gyeongbu Line.

Railway stations in North Chungcheong Province